Izaak Daniël "Daan" den Bleijker (30 June 1928 - 30 June 2003) was a Dutch footballer who was active as a forward.

Club career
Den Bleijker made his debut for Feijenoord on 8 April 1951 against Willem II and scored 30 goals in 111 official matches for the club. He scored Feijenoord's first goal in professional football, in 1954 against Vitesse and scored 4 goals in the first Klassieker on 11 November 1956 when Feijenoord trashed Ajax 7-3.

He later played for DHC.

References

External links
 Profile - Feyenoord Online

1928 births
2003 deaths
Footballers from Rotterdam
Association football forwards
Dutch footballers
Feyenoord players
DHC Delft players
BVV Barendrecht managers
RVVH managers
Dutch football managers